Outwood Academy Redcar (formerly Redcar Academy) is a mixed secondary school with academy status located in Redcar, North Yorkshire. The school had 487 pupils enrolled in September 2021.

The current Chief Executive Principal is Julie Slater.

History
Originally Coatham County Modern, the school has also previously been known as Westfields, West Redcar School, and Redcar Community College.

Redcar Community College, initially a community school with a specialism in visual and performing arts, was awarded specialist status for Visual and Performing Arts in 2004. In November 2009 it became a foundation school.

In December 2012 the school converted to academy status, becoming Redcar Academy. It retained its specialism in visual and performing arts.

In June 2015, an Ofsted inspection found Redcar Academy to "require improvement". In November 2015 the school began receiving support from Outwood Grange Academies Trust (OGAT). The school implemented OGAT's behaviour management policy, style of uniform, and appointed Angela Sweeten—previously of Outwood Academy Ripon—as headteacher. In June 2017, the school announced it would be sponsored by OGAT and reopen as "Outwood Academy Redcar" in September 2017.

In October 2017, the school joined Outwood Grange Academies Trust, and became Outwood Academy Redcar.

References

External links
 

Secondary schools in Redcar and Cleveland
Academies in Redcar and Cleveland
Redcar
Redcar